You Can't Beat the Law is a 1943 American drama film directed by Phil Rosen; also known as Prison Mutiny (American TV title).

Plot

Johnny Gray (Edward Norris) is a self-proclaimed playboy.  Gray's car is found at the scene of a crime; and although it's been stolen, it is enough to convict Gray of the holdup.  Rico (Willy Castello) is the real criminal, but never becomes a suspect.  Rico's gang members Creeper, Harry, and Red are also sent to jail with Gray.  When Gray's fiancée even believes Johnny is guilty, he becomes angry and a difficult prisoner.  Gray is eventually put in the same cell as Cain (Jack La Rue); who is the head of a gang that's planning a prison break.  Frank Sanders (Milburn Stone) is a new warden at the prison, and he eventually earns Gray's trust.  Gray is transferred to different cell with a new cell-mate, and given the chance to work in the prison gardens.  While working in the gardens, Gray meets Amy Duncan (Joan Woodbury), who is the daughter of one of the prison guards.  Rico plans a prison break from the outside, but is killed in the attempt.  Eventually one of Rico's men admits that Johnny Gray is an innocent man.

Cast 
 Edward Norris as Johnny Gray
 Joan Woodbury as Amy Duncan
 Jack La Rue as Convict Cain, Prison-break Leader
 Milburn Stone as Frank Sanders (new warden)
 Charles Jordan as Rico Henchman Creeper
 Kenneth Harlan as 1st Warden
 Robert Homans as Prison Guard Duncan, Amy's Father
 George Kamel as Rico Henchman Jumpy
 Bryant Washburn as Attorney
 Willy Castello as Rico, gang boss
 Inna Gest as Patricia Bedford
 Selmer Jackson as Gattrnor
 Paul McVey as Wayne, death row inmate
 Tristram Coffin as Gang Lawyer

External links 
 
 
 

1943 films
1940s prison films
1940s English-language films
American black-and-white films
Monogram Pictures films
American drama films
1943 drama films
Films directed by Phil Rosen
1940s American films